Artan Jazxhi (born 6 July 2001) is an Albanian professional footballer who currently play as a centre-back for Albanian club Teuta.

References

2001 births
Living people
People from Durrës County
People from Durrës
Albanian footballers
Association football defenders
Kategoria Superiore players
Shkëndija Durrës players
KF Teuta Durrës players